Lydia H. Tilton (Heath; July 10, 1839 – July 26, 1915) was an American journalist and temperance worker. Also a poet, she was well known in literary circles. "Old Glory", lyrics by Tilton, set to the tune of "Dixie", was the national song of the Daughters of the American Revolution (D.A.R.).

Early life and education
Lydia Priscilla Heath was born in Tuftonboro, New Hampshire, July 10, 1839. Her mother was Chloe (Blake) Heath (1800-1877). Her father was Abel Heath (1797-1852), a minister of the Methodist Episcopal Church, who was known to the Methodists throughout New England. He died during a Session of Conference in Nashua, New Hampshire, in 1852, leaving a widow and eight children. From this time, Lydia resided in Manchester, New Hampshire.

She was educated in the public schools of Manchester, and in the New Hampshire Conference Seminary.

Career
Tilton taught in the latter school, and in Henniker Academy.

In Manchester, on December 6, 1866, she married Rufus Newell Tilton (1840–1901), and thereafter resided in Washington, D.C., as Mr. Tilton worked for the U.S. Treasury Department. They had two daughters, Emma (b. 1872) and Anna (b. 1874).

As a newspaper correspondent and as a writer of occasional poems, Tilton developed a large circle of literary friends.

Tilton served as the Corresponding Secretary and the Superintendent of Temperance Instruction of the Non-Partisan National Woman's Christian Temperance Union in Washington, D.C. Subsequently, she served as the national legislative secretary of the Non-Partisan National Woman's Christian Temperance Union, being active in its work.

Death
Lydia H. Tilton died in Washington, D.C., July 26, 1915. Burial was at Arlington National Cemetery.

Selected works

Poems
 "All Things" (1883)
 "The Bridal Wreath" (1883) 
 "Furnishing the House" (1883)
 "The Kiss at the Door" (1883)
 "Words" (1895) 
 "All Things" (1895) 
 "The Sparrows" (1895)

Songs
 "Old Glory" (lyrics)

References

External links
 

1839 births
1915 deaths
19th-century American journalists
19th-century American poets
19th-century American women writers
American women journalists
American women poets
American temperance activists
American lyricists
American newspaper reporters and correspondents
People from Carroll County, New Hampshire
Woman's Christian Temperance Union people
Daughters of the American Revolution people
Educators from New Hampshire
Wikipedia articles incorporating text from A Woman of the Century
Tilton School alumni